Hello 2021 was a series of five localized virtual New Year's Eve countdown specials which were broadcast on YouTube on December 31, 2020. Originating from the Americas, the United Kingdom, South Korea, Japan and India, the specials celebrated the most notable videos of the year 2020 and also featured musical performances and guest celebrity appearances. It was co-produced by YouTube and Fremantle.

Editions

Hello 2021: Americas
Hello 2021: Americas was hosted by YouTuber Juanpa Zurita and actress Storm Reid and premiered on December 31 at 10:30pm EST/7:30pm PST/9:30pm Mexican Time and January 1 at 12:30am Argentinian Time/Brazilian Time on the YouTube Originals channel. It featured appearances by various actors, musicians, and internet personalities, as well as segments from numerous YouTubers. It also had performances by Dua Lipa, J Balvin, YG, Karol G, and Kane Brown.

Appearances
The following personalities appeared on Hello 2021: Americas:

 Ben Azelart 
 David Blaine
 Ryan Blaney
 James Blunt
 Joel Kim Booster
 Dom Brack
 Karamo Brown
 Marques Brownlee
 Naomi Campbell
 Sabrina Carpenter
 Emma Chamberlain
 Charli and Dixie D'Amelio's family
 Andrew Davila
 The Dolan Twins
 Meg Donnelly
 Dude Perfect
 Moriah Elizabeth
 Jimmy Fallon
 Fortune Feimster
 Midori Francis
 Avani Gregg
 Guava Juice
 Hunter Hayes
 Lexi Hensler
 Crawford Millham Horton
 Hyram
 Trevor Jackson
 Larray
 Zara Larsson
 Demi Lovato
 Rudy Mancuso
 Manny MUA
 MatPat
 Trixie Mattel
 Matthew McConaughey
 Brooklyn and Bailey McKnight
 Brad Mondo
 MrBeast
 Ne-Yo
 Finneas O'Connell
 The Onyx Family
 Stephanie Patrick
 PatrickStarrr
 Chelsea Peretti
 Rob Riggle
 Brent and Lexi Rivera
 Bretman Rock
 RuPaul
 Tom Sandoval
 Tom Schwartz
 Shangela
 Jay Shetty
 Alexandra Shipp
 Megan Stalter
 Chrishell Stause
 Hannah Stocking
 Alan and Alex Stokes
 Sarah Tiana
 Bubba Wallace
 Pierson Wodzynski
 Yungblud
 ZHC
 Maddie Ziegler

Hello 2021: UK
Sponsored by JD Sports, Hello 2021: UK had appearances by Behzinga, Big Narstie, Katherine Ryan, Michaela Coel, the cast of People Just Do Nothing (known as Kurupt FM), Yammy, WillNE, Holly H, Natasia Demetriou, and Ellie White. It also had performances and cameos by Dua Lipa, Anne-Marie, MNEK with Joel Corry, Aitch & AJ Tracey, Adrian Bliss, Calfreezy, Cassetteboy, DJ Beats, Humza Arshad, Jessica Kellgren-Fozard, Joe Wicks, Naomi Campbell, Nigel Ng, Novympia, Olivia Neill, Raye, and RuPaul.

Like its American counterpart, the British special will premiere on December 31 at 10:30pm GMT through the YouTube Originals channel.

Hello 2021: Korea
Hello 2021: Korea was hosted by comedians Yang Se-chan and Hwang Je-sung and will feature appearances by top and rising Korean content creators and artists such as GGILGGIL Market, Tester Hoon, and Balming Tiger. It will begin streaming on December 31 at 11pm KST via the YouTube Korea Spotlight channel.

Hello 2021: Japan
Hosted by YouTuber Orutana Channel and actress Mochizuki Rie, Hello 2021: Japan was a quiz show testing the guests' knowledge on 2020 YouTube trends and trivias. Joining the hosts were Japanese content creators Tokai On Air, Puritto Channel, Emirin, Paparapys, Skypeace, Vamyun, Dekakin, Hanaodengan, and M.S.S. Project.

The Japanese special was streamed on the YouTube Japan Spotlight channel on December 31 at 11:45pm JST.

Hello 2021: India
Hello 2021: India was a 60-minute countdown show which had the biggest and most buzzworthy musicians, comedians and Bollywood artists. It had appearances by Tiger Shroff, Badshah, Zakir Khan, Jonita Gandhi, Benny Dayal, and Aastha Gill, including a performance by Dua Lipa.

The Indian special wasstreamed on December 31 at 11pm IST on the YouTube India Spotlight channel.

References

YouTube Premium original programming
New Year's television specials
2020 YouTube videos
2021 YouTube videos